Sonohara (written: 園原 or 薗原) may refer to:

, Japanese racewalker
, a dam in Gunma Prefecture, Japan

Japanese-language surnames